The George Trimble House in Colonie in Albany County, New York.  It was built in 1909 and is a -story stucco house in the Arts and Crafts style.  It has a gable roof and a large shed dormer across the rear elevation.

It was listed on the National Register of Historic Places in 1985.

References

Houses on the National Register of Historic Places in New York (state)
Houses completed in 1909
Houses in Albany County, New York
National Register of Historic Places in Albany County, New York